The White Company is a retailer of bedroom, home, clothing, and fragrance goods, whose  head office is located at London's Television Centre.

It was founded by Chrissie Rucker in 1994. Mary Homer left Topshop in March 2017 to head the company.

History 
The White Company was established in 1994 as a mail order business selling items through a 12-page catalogue which has grown into a multi-channel, international business. Started up with a small government grant and £6,000 inheritance, it originally had a 500 people mailing list. Chrissie Rucker managed to gather some editorial coverage - including the Financial Times - and press releases which led to it making £80,000 in the first year, just breaking even.

Originally encompassing products including sheets, covers and pillows, it later expanded into home décor, dinnerware, fragrances, candles, furniture and clothing. A children's division called 'The Little White Company' was also added.

International sales witnessed a faster growth with sales rising 11.3 percent year-on-year to $14 million (£10.2 million) compared to a 7.2 percent growth reported in the UK at $258 million (£188 million).

In 2017, the company's products were chosen to outfit the business and first class of British Airways' planes.

Locations 
As of May 2022, The White Company has 70 stores, clearance stores, and concession stores.

They have 61 UK stores, including concessions and clearance stores, 6 US concessions, 2 Irish stores—1 of which is a clearance store, and 1 Jersey concession.

The American concessions are located in Nordstrom stores, while the UK concessions are situated in a variety of retailers, including: Harrods and 3 Selfridges sites—Oxford Street, the Bullring, and the Trafford Centre.

The White Company also has a number of stores in UK shopping centres, including: Westfield London and Westfield Stratford City, Bluewater, Liverpool One, and Meadowhall.

They opened their first shop in London's Symons Street.

References

British companies established in 1994
Retail companies of the United Kingdom
Mail-order retailers